Amine Boukhlouf (born 30 January 1984) is an Algerian footballer. He currently plays for USM Annaba in the Algerian Ligue Professionnelle 1.

Club career
In 2010, Boukhlouf was a member of the CA Batna team that reached the final of the 2009–10 Algerian Cup. In the final, Boukhlouf started the match as they were defeated 3-0 by ES Sétif.

International career
In January 2005, Boukhlouf was called up to the Algerian Under-23 National Team for a friendly tournament in Doha, Qatar. In April, he was also of the team at the 2005 Islamic Solidarity Games in Saudi Arabia. In total, he made 6 appearances for the Under-23 team.

Honours
 Finalist of the Algerian Cup once with CA Batna in 2009–10 Algerian Cup

References

External links
 DZFoot Profile
 

1984 births
Living people
People from Batna, Algeria
Algerian footballers
Algeria under-23 international footballers
Algerian Ligue Professionnelle 1 players
CA Batna players
MSP Batna players
NA Hussein Dey players
OMR El Annasser players
USM Annaba players
Association football forwards
21st-century Algerian people